The Tahltan River is a tributary of the Stikine River in northwest part of the province of British Columbia, Canada. The lower Tahltan River marks the boundary between the Tahltan Highland and the Nahlin Plateau, both of which are part of the larger Stikine Plateau region.

The Tahltan River's watershed's land cover is classified as 35.0% conifer forest, 29.6% shrubland, 14.0% barren, 9.1% herbaceous, 8.5% mixed forest, and small amounts of other cover.

The Tahltan River is named for the Tahltan people and is in their traditional territory.

Geography
The Tahltan River originates in high glaciated peaks on the east edge of the Boundary Ranges and the west edge of the Tahltan Highland. It first flows south and southeast then east and northeast, gathering many unnamed tributary streams. After passing north of Tahltan Lake it is joined by Johnny Tashoots Creeks, which flows from Tahltan Lake. The Tahltan River is then joined by Harper Reed Creek and Lovell Creek, both flowing from the north, then Tutesheta Creek, flowing from the south. After flowing north briefly the Tahltan River is joined by its main tributary, the Little Tahltan River near the Indian reserve of Tahltan Forks 5, of the Tahltan First Nation.

Turning east and southeast, the Tahltan River is joined by numerous tributaries including Bear Creek, Beatty Creek, Newell Creek, Middle Creek, and Hartz Creek. In its last few kilometres the Tahltan River flows south to join the Stikine River in the Grand Canyon of the Stikine, at the locality of Tahltan and the Tahltan Indian Reserve Tahltan 1.

History
The historic Yukon Telegraph Trail runs through the Tahltan River's watershed, following the Tutesheta Creek tributary and crossing the Tahltan River near the Little Tahltan River confluence.

Ecology
The Tahltan River is a major contributor to the Stikine River's salmon runs and the most significant contributor of Chinook salmon, sockeye salmon, and other salmonids like steelhead trout. Spawning habitat is found throughout the Tahltan's watershed.

This slide created a partial barrier to salmon migration. In 2018 large scale remediation efforts were completed, widening the river's channel and distributing rock debris downstream. This has improved fish migration although the slide debris may still be a significant barrier under certain flow conditions.

See also
List of British Columbia rivers

References

External links
 

 

Cassiar Land District
Rivers of British Columbia
Stikine Country
Tahltan
Tahltan Highland
Tributaries of the Stikine River